Bartenura or variants may refer to:

Obadiah ben Abraham of Bartenura, a 15th-century Italian rabbi
Bartenura, an Italian wine brand
Bertinoro, a town in Italy